Sabrina Botrán Cordón (born 18 April 2001) is a Guatemalan footballer who plays as a goalkeeper for Comunicaciones FC and the Guatemala women's national team.

See also
List of Guatemala women's international footballers

References

2001 births
Living people
Women's association football goalkeepers
Guatemalan women's footballers
Guatemala women's international footballers
Montverde Academy alumni
Guatemalan expatriate footballers
Guatemalan expatriate sportspeople in the United States
Expatriate women's soccer players in the United States